Double Down may refer to:

 Double down, a betting technique in blackjack
 Double Down: Game Change 2012, a 2013 book about the 2012 United States Presidential election
 Double Down (comics), a DC Comics villain
 Double Down (film), a 2001 American drama film
 Double Down, a 2005 American independent film produced and directed by Neil Breen
 "Double Down" (Journeyman), an episode of Journeyman
 Double Down (sandwich), a sandwich offered by Kentucky Fried Chicken
 Double Down, a televised high school quiz program in Syracuse, New York
 Double down, a roller coaster element involving two separate drops
 Diary of a Wimpy Kid: Double Down, the eleventh book in the Diary of a Wimpy Kid series

See also 
 Double Down Live: 1980 & 2008, a 2009 album by ZZ Top
 Double Down Live Tour, a 2009 concert tour by ZZ Top